Joseph Burgess (1853–1934) was a British journalist, writer and Labour politician.

He was born on 3 July 1853 in Failsworth, Lancashire, the third of six children of handloom weavers, and was educated at a print works school in Failsworth. He started work in a card-cutting room at the age of six and worked as a cotton operative until he was 28. He married three times, having six children. He died in January 1934.

Career 
He was active in the creation of the Independent Labour Party (ILP) and the Labour Party.  He was elected to the first National Administrative Council of the ILP, and served on it again from 1899 until 1901.  He unsuccessfully ran as an ILP parliamentary candidate for Leicester in 1894 and 1895 before taking a role of organising secretary for the ILP between 1897 and 1902.  He was a member of the Glasgow City Council between 1902-5 and unsuccessfully ran as an ILP candidate for Glasgow Camlachie in 1906, and Montrose in 1908 and 1910. He resigned from the ILP in 1915.

Throughout his career he was involved in newspapers:
 1881: correspondent for a local newspaper
 1884: started his own short-lived paper, the Oldham Operative
 1885–89: sub-editor of the Cotton Factory Times
 1889–91: manager of the Yorkshire Factory Times
 1891–93: editor of Workman's Times
 1914: editor of the Bradford Pioneer
 1919: editorial staff for the London Evening Standard and the Pall Mall Gazette

Publications 
 John Burns: the rise and progress of a right honourable (1911)
 Homeland or Empire (1915)
 British agriculture versus foreign tributes (1925)
 Will Lloyd George replace Ramsay MacDonald (1926)

References

Further reading 
 A. T. Lane, Biographical Dictionary of European Labor Leaders, 1995. p 164–5 
 unpublished typescript 'Nineteenth Century Lancashire Textile Operatives Tribulations, 1800–95 held in the Labour Party Archives, London
 A Potential Poet?  His Autobiography and Verse (1927)
 J. Burnett, D. Vincent, and D. Mayalls, eds., The Autobiography of the Working Class, vol 1.
 Kevin McPhillips, Joseph Burgess (1853–1934) and the Founding of the Independent Labour Party'', 2005. 

People from Failsworth
1853 births
1934 deaths
Independent Labour Party National Administrative Committee members